Yamal Railway is a railway operator in Yamalo-Nenets Autonomous Okrug in Russia.

Main information
The company was created in 2003 by the Yamal administration and Russian Railways.

The main activity is the operation of the lines Korotchaevo – Novy Urengoy–Nadym and Korotchaevo–Novy Urengoy–Yamburg.

Projects of the Yamal railway company:
 The completion and restoration of the railway line Obskaya–Salekhard–Nadym;
 The construction of new railway line midnight – art Ob-2 (the project was suspended in February 2012 in the absence of reliable data on the availability of industrial mineral reserves on the Eastern slope of the Urals);
 The completion and restoration of the line Korotchaevo–Igarka.

The branch Novy Urengoy–Pangody–Nadym was restored in the 1970s, part of the Transpolar mainline.

Plans
The company develops the Obskaya – Polunochnoye railway construction project along the Eastern slope of the Ural mountains. Investment substantiation for construction of railway track prepares Saint-Petersburg company. Preliminary costs will be not less than 62 billion.

The company also expects to recover the Labytnangi – Nadym Transpolar mainline, which was abandoned in 1953.

Construction of the Obskaya – Polunochnoye railway and full recovery of Transpolar railway required the construction of a bridge across the Ob river. The agreement on construction of the combined rail and road bridge across the Ob was signed in December 2008 by the administration of the Yamal-Nenets Autonomous Okrug and the Federal Agency of railway transport of Russia.

Ownership
Owners of JSC Yamal Railway Company as of December 2015:
 Open Joint-Stock Company "Razvitiya Corporation" (55%)
 Russian Railways (45%)

References

External links

 Official website
 Transport of Yamal
 Plans of the company
 Information about the company

Railway lines in Russia
Companies based in Yamalo-Nenets Autonomous Okrug
Railway companies of Russia